Mikhail Pavlovich Sabinin (monk Gobron, ; 1845–1900) was a Russo-Georgian monk, historian of the Georgian Orthodox Church and icon painter.

He was born to the Russian priest from Tver, Pavel Sabinin, and a Georgian woman. Educated at the Tiflis gymnasium in the 1860s, he then attended St. Petersburg Theologian Academy and attained to a magister degree for his work History of the Georgian Church until the End of the 6th Century ("История грузинской церкви до конца VI в." [СПб., 1877]), the first comprehensive treatment of the subject produced in Russian. He travelled in several regions of Georgia, studying monuments of Christian architecture, copying frescos and icons, recording legends and collecting manuscripts. In St. Petersburg, he was tonsured a monk and given the name Gobron after a 10th-century Georgian saint. In 1882, he published The Paradise of Georgia (საქართველოს სამოთხე; St. Petersburg, 1882), a voluminous lithographed edition of biographies of important Georgian Orthodox Christian saints. In the 1880s, he served at the famous Iviron Monastery on Mount Athos. In 1882 he published also The Passion of Eustathius of Mtskheta.

In 1898, he clashed with the office of Russian exarchate at Tiflis over his criticism of Russification and was removed from Georgia to Moscow where he died of pneumonia on May 10, 1900.

See also
 List of Russian artists
 Eustathius of Mtskheta

References

External links 

 Полное жизнеописание святых грузинской церкви (СПб., 1871) (Complete Vitae of the Saints of Georgian Church [St. Petersburg, 1871) by Mikhail Sabinin. Iakov Krotov Library. Accessed on September 3, 2007.

1845 births
1900 deaths
Artists from Tbilisi
Historians from the Russian Empire
Artists from the Russian Empire
Writers from Tbilisi
Members of the Georgian Orthodox Church
Christian monks from Georgia (country)
Russian Orthodox monks
19th-century historians from Georgia (country)
Deaths from pneumonia in Russia
Monks from the Russian Empire
Georgian people of Russian descent
People associated with Mount Athos
People associated with Iviron Monastery